Kim Robbins (born 12 June 1988) is a wheelchair basketball player from Australia.

Biography 

He was a member of the 2009 Under-23 Spinners team.  His first senior major international competition was at the 2018 Wheelchair Basketball World Championship in Hamburg, Germany where the Rollers won the bronze medal.

He plays for Be Active Perth Wheelcats in the National Wheelchair Basketball League.

References

External links
Australia Profile

1988 births
Living people
Paralympic wheelchair basketball players of Australia
Point guards